List of K-pop songs on the Billboard charts is a compilation of weekly chart information for K-pop music published by the Billboard charts, and reported on by Billboard K-Town, an online Billboard column. This is a list of K-pop songs and singles, and songs performed by K-pop artists, on the Billboard charts.

2001 – present
This list depends on continual updates taken from * and *.
 Charts with all updates 2009–present are marked (Complete).
Billboard artists comprehensive update incomplete.
Billboard charts comprehensive update incomplete.
The list is currently minus portions of Psy performance on 58 charts.
The list is exclusive of Korea K-Pop Hot 100 data.
Figures in red highlight indicate the highest rating received by K-pop artists on that chart.
 – Current week's charting

Adult Contemporary
 Chart started 1961-07-17
 Chart not updated since 2021-10-02, possibly discontinued

Adult Pop Airplay (also called Adult Top 40 Airplay)
 Chart started 1996-03-16

Alternative Airplay
 Chart started 1988-09-10

Billboard Global 200 (Complete)
 Chart started 2020-09-19

Billboard Global Excl. U.S. (Complete)
 Chart started 2020-09-19

Billboard Hot 100 (Complete)

Bubbling Under Hot 100 Singles (Complete)
 Chart started 1992-12-05 (Chart is missing results for week 2009-11-14)

Bubbling Under R&B/Hip-Hop
Chart discontinued after 2020-01-18

Canada All-Format Airplay

Canada CHR/Top 40

Canadian Digital Song Sales
 Chart started 1996-11-16

Canadian Hot 100

Canada Hot AC

Dance Club Songs
 Chart discontinued after 2020-03-28

Dance/Electronic Digital Song Sales
 Chart started 2010-01-23

Dance/Electronic Streaming Songs
 Chart started 2013-04-20

Dance/Mix Show Airplay
 Chart started 2003-10-17

Dance Singles Sales
Chart discontinued after 2013-11-30

Digital Song Sales
 Chart started 2004-10-30

Global Dance Songs
Chart started 2006-12-02
Chart discontinued after 2013-06-29

Heatseeker Songs
Chart discontinued after 2014-11-29

Hot Alternative Songs

Hot Dance/Electronic Songs
 Chart started 2010-01-23

Hot R&B/Hip-Hop Singles Sales
Chart started 1992-07-11
Chart discontinued after 2013-11-30

Hot R&B/Hip-Hop Songs

Hot Rap Songs

Hot Rock & Alternative Songs

Hot Singles Sales
 Chart reduced from 50 to 25 on 2010-12-04
 Chart reduced from 25 to 15 on 2014-12-06
 Chart discontinued after 2017-11-25

Hot Trending Songs (Powered by Twitter)
The Hot Trending Songs chart posts both daily and weekly version. The daily version is not included here.

 Chart started 2021-10-30
 Chart was revamped and skipped the chart dated 2022-10-29

Japan Hot 100

Kid Digital Song Sales
Chart discontinued after 2020-01-18

Latin Airplay
 Chart started 2012-10-20

Latin Digital Song Sales (Complete)
 Chart started 2010-01-23

Latin Pop Digital Song Sales
 Chart started 2010-01-23
Chart discontinued after 2020-01-18

Latin Rhythm Airplay
 Chart started 2005-08-13

LyricFind Global
 Chart started 2015-11-07

LyricFind U.S.
 Chart started 2015-11-07

Mainstream Top 40 (also called Pop Songs and Pop Airplay) (Complete)
 Chart started 1992-10-03

Mainstream Top 40 Recurrents

Mexico Airplay
 Chart started 2011-10-01
 Chart not updated since 2022-09-03, possibly discontinued

Mexico Ingles Airplay
 Chart started 2011-10-01
 Chart not updated since 2022-09-03, possibly discontinued

On-Demand Streaming Songs
 Chart started 2012-03-03
Chart discontinued after 2020-11-28

Pop Digital Song Sales
 Chart started 2011-10-01
Chart discontinued after 2020-01-18

R&B Digital Song Sales
 Chart started 2012-11-10

R&B/Hip-Hop Digital Song Sales

Radio Songs (previously called Hot 100 Airplay)
 Chart started 1984-10-20; available dates from 1990-11-03

Rap Digital Song Sales
 Chart started 2010-01-23

Rhythmic Airplay (Complete)
 Chart started 1992-10-03

Rock & Alternative Airplay

Rock Digital Song Sales
 Chart started 2010-01-23

Songs Of The Summer
 Chart started 2010-07-17 and runs in the summer, from Memorial Day through Labor Day.

Streaming Songs
 Chart started 2013-01-19

World Digital Song Sales (Complete)

See also
 List of K-pop on the Billboard charts
 List of K-pop albums on the Billboard charts
 List of K-pop on the Billboard year-end charts
 Timeline of K-pop at Billboard
 Timeline of K-pop at Billboard in the 2020s
 Korea K-Pop Hot 100
 List of K-Pop concerts held outside Asia
 List of K-pop artists
 List of South Korean idol groups
 World Digital Song Sales

Notes

References

External links
Billboard popular charts
Billboard complete artist/chart search -subscription only

Billboard charts
K-pop songs
K-pop songs
South Korean music-related lists
2009 in South Korean music
2010 in South Korean music
2011 in South Korean music
2012 in South Korean music
2013 in South Korean music
2014 in South Korean music
2015 in South Korean music
2016 in South Korean music
2017 in South Korean music
2018 in South Korean music
2019 in South Korean music
2020 in South Korean music
2000s in South Korean music
2010s in South Korean music
2020s in South Korean music